Walter, Count of Rethel (d. 1262 was a French nobleman.  He was a younger son of Count Hugh II of Rethel and his wife, Felicitas of Broyes.  In 1251, he succeeded his brother John as the ruling count of Rethel.  No marriage or children are known.

Walter died in 1262, and was succeeded by his youngest brother, Manasses V.

Counts of Rethel
13th-century births
1262 deaths
13th-century French people